Ummadi Kutumbam is a 1967 Indian Telugu-language comedy drama film, produced by N. Trivikrama Rao under the NAT & Ramakrishna Cine Studios banner and directed by D. Yoganand. It stars N. T. Rama Rao, Savitri and Krishna Kumari, with music composed by T. V. Raju.

Plot
The film begins with a joint family in a village, where an old mother has four sons. The elder one Nagaiah works as a clerk, his wife is Gauri a selfish woman and they have a son Kittu. The second son Chandram takes care of their farming, his wife is Kantham a shrew. The third son is Mukundam who becomes a doctor with the combined effort of the family, his wife Rama a benevolent. The youngest, Ramu is a smart village guy and a famous stage artist. However, he respects his family and endears Kittu a lot. Mukundam becomes a good practitioner in the city, and he dislikes Rama because of her traditional behavior for which he quits her. Thereafter, he goes into the clutches of a call girl Mohini and neglects the family.

At home, all the daughters-in-law quarrel, in between, Chandram leaves for his in-law's house, Gauri divides the house into two, and scorns Rama. So, Ramu decides to get back his brother and moves to the city. On the way, he gets acquainted with a beautiful girl Sarada, daughter of the Zamindar, who shelters him for a night when Ramu protects the Zamindar from thieves. The next day, he reaches Mukundam, understands his state, and becomes distressed. Sarada consoles him, meets Mohini, and asks her to leave Mukundam, but she affronts her. Now Sarada decides to take revenge, so, she civilized Ramu when they fall in love.

Meanwhile, Chandram is slighted in his in-law's house and leaves that place. Viewing it, Kantham's younger brother corrects and sends her back. In the village, Kittu becomes ailed due to depression on Ramu. At the same time, the village doctor Pasupathi tries to molest Rama when she attempts suicide, rescued by her mother-in-law and they move towards Mukundam. Parallelly, Ramu in a disguised form traps Mohini, by which he rectifies Mukundam and sends him to the village. On his return, Ramu meets his mother & sister-in-law, and everyone proceeds to their hometown. In between, Chandram also accompanies, after reaching home they spot Kittu on his deathbed when Ramu recoup him with his love & affection. Finally, the entire family is reunited and the movie ends on a happy note with the marriage of Ramu & Sarada.

Cast
 N. T. Rama Rao as Ramu
 Savitri as Rama
 Krishna Kumari as Sarada 
 Relangi as Nagaiah
 Nagabhushanam as Zamindar Bhavani Prasad
 Satyanarayana as Chandram
 Prabhakar Reddy as Dr. Mukunda Rao 
 Allu Ramalingaiah as Pasupathi
 Raja Babu as Tippayya
 Mukkamala as Subbaiah
 Balakrishna
 Nagaraju 
 Suryakantam as Gowri
 S. Varalakshmi as Kantham 
 Vanisri as Venki
 Hemalatha
 Chaya Devi 
 L. Vijayalakshmi as Mohini
 Potti Prasad

Soundtrack

Music composed by T. V. Raju.

Awards
The film was selected by the Film Federation of India as one of its entries to the 1968 Moscow Film Festival.

Box office
 The film celebrated a Silver Jubilee and ran for 197 days at Durga Kala Mandir, Vijayawada.

References

External links

1960s Telugu-language films
1967 comedy-drama films
1967 films
Films directed by D. Yoganand
Films scored by T. V. Raju
Indian comedy-drama films